Wikimedia in India refers to all the Wikipedia and Wikimedia projects which are of special interest to people in India or interested in topics relating to India.

Content in languages of India
Wikipedia has different versions for various languages in India. These language Wikipedia versions have their own culture and history of development.

Bengali Wikipedia
Bhojpuri Wikipedia
Hindi Wikipedia
Maithili Wikipedia
Malayalam Wikipedia
Marathi Wikipedia
Odia Wikipedia
Punjabi Wikipedia
Sanskrit Wikipedia
Santali Wikipedia
Tamil Wikipedia
Telugu Wikipedia

Hindi and English language versions are the most popular in India.

The Wikimedia chapter in India organized the Wikimedia community to establish Santhali language Wikipedia in August 2018. This was part of an effort to feature a tribal language.

Google advises Wikipedia and suggests topics on which Wikimedia community volunteers should write articles, based on the most frequent Google search terms.

In September 2019 the Ministry of Science and Technology expressed an intent to promote the development of Hindi language Wikipedia articles on sciences.

Health experts have collaborated with Wikipedia editors to share information about vaccines in local language.

Readers of various languages have differing interests. For example, in 2019 "Shivaji" was the most popular article in Marathi Wikipedia, "Guru Granth Sahib" was the most popular in Punjabi, and "vagina" was the most popular in Bhojpuri. Wikipedia articles are sometimes the targets of political debate. Articles where there have been discussions and controversy include, "2020 Delhi riots" and "Jai Shri Ram".

Wikimedia community organization in India
Wiki Conference India is a Wikipedia conference first hosted in India in 2011.

In 2004 Wikimedia editors in India began planning a regional organization, Wikimedia India. Organizers drafted by-laws in 2007, and in 2008 convened meetings with the assistance of the Centre for Internet and Society. The organization was founded in July 2009 as the 29th Wikimedia chapter.

A magazine editor named Sangram Keshari Senapati was praised for his development of Odia Wikipedia.

The Wikipedia in Education Programme (WEP) started in 2013 at various colleges. In 2011, students at colleges and universities in Pune were recognized for participating in a Wikipedia education project. In 2020, participants in the WEP were developing content in Tulu.

In 2020, the volunteer Wikipedia community had been funding the majority of Wiki community activities in India.

The Karavali Wikimedia community described that they edit among English, Kannada, the Tulu, and the Konkani Wikipedia language versions. They edit on topics including health and women's interest.

Wikimedia Foundation engagement in India

Google sponsored Project Tiger, which was a program to develop Wikipedia content in languages of India. Google provided Chromebooks, while the Wikimedia Foundation offers stipends for an internet connection. Some volunteers balked at the list of subjects provided by Google – mostly topics trending on Google, which some volunteers found irrelevant. Later, a local list was provided.

The Wikimedia Foundation runs fundraising campaigns asking Indian people to donate. One news source described that request for money as awkwardly emotional.

In 2011 the Wikimedia Foundation opened a branch office in India. One of the goals of establishing an office there was to increase regional fundraising.

Indian government and Wikipedia
The Indian government regulates websites including Wikipedia with the Information Technology Rules, 2021. As those rules were being drafted in 2020, some news sources speculated that Wikipedia was not in compliance with those rules.

References